The Desert Tortoise Research Natural Area (DTRNA) is a  area in the western Mojave Desert, located in eastern Kern County, Southern California. It was created to protect the native desert tortoise (Gopherus agassizii), which is also the California state reptile.

The area is located at the southwestern end of the Rand Mountains, northeast of California City, and has an interpretive center for visitors.

 of the land was given to the Bureau of Land Management in a 1980 agreement over the Great Western Cities Company land schemes as part of an effort to acquire clear title.

The Bureau of Land Management recognized the significance of the area and designated it an "Area of Critical Environmental Concern" and as a "Research Natural Area" in 1980.

References

External links
 Desert Tortoise Preserve Committee.org: Desert Tortoise Natural Area website

Protected areas of Kern County, California
Protected areas of the Mojave Desert
Natural history of the Mojave Desert
Natural history of Kern County, California
Bureau of Land Management areas in California